A button blanket is wool blanket embellished with mother-of-pearl buttons, created by Northwest Coastal tribes, that is worn for ceremonial purposes.

Ceremonial robes and their associated regalia have been among the most spectacular creations of the Indian people of the Northwest Coast of North America. For generations, these robes have served as insignia of family and clan histories, duties, rights, and privileges, and they are beginning to mark as well a determined presence in contemporary Canadian society. These robes are powerful statements of identity and, donning them, people become in a real sense what they wear.

Rather than sleeping equipment, the blankets are used as capes and gifts at ceremonial dances and potlatches.

The blankets were originally acquired from the Hudson's Bay Company traders during the mid-19th century. The trade blankets were typically dark blue duffel and decorated with buttons made from abalone or dentalium shells. The central crest typically portrayed a symbol of the wearer's family heritage.

The blankets usually have a red border on the upper and lateral edges. A central crest figure is created from the buttons and red flannel appliqué. Button blankets are worn over the shoulders and the crest design hangs on the back of the wearer.

Among the people who make button blankets, the blankets are not hung from walls except at funerals or near the graves of chiefs. 

Haida artist Florence Davidson (1896–1993) was known for her button blankets.

In 2015, law student Christina Gray of the Lax Kw'alaams Tsimshian nation formally obtained the right to wear a button blanket and cedar hat with her barrister's robes during the ceremony in which she was called to the bar in Ontario. She cited the use of the button blanket as a symbol of her nation's legal traditions.

See also
Alaska Native art
Chilkat weaving
Native American art
Northwest Coast art

References

Further reading
 Jensen, Doreen and Polly Sargent. Robes of Power: Totem Poles on Cloth. University of British Columbia Press. Vancouver. 1986. 
 Wade, Edwin L. The Arts of the North American Indian: Native Traditions in Evolution. Manchester, VT: Hudson Hills, 1986. .
 Get Your Own Superhero Portrait from your photo from Love Custom Design. Custom Photo Blanket & Face Pillow Retrieved 9 December 2022

Blankets
Alaska Native culture
Indigenous textile art of the Americas
Native American clothing
Pacific Northwest art
Buttons